The Evening Show is an evening news and current affairs program based in Seoul, South Korea that airs weeknights from 6:10 to 8:00 pm on Seoul Traffic Broadcasting's English-language outlet, TBS eFM (101.3 MHz).  The program describes itself as "one of the most listened to English programs that cover current affairs in Korea and around the world."

History
The program was part of TBS eFM's inaugural broadcast on December 1, 2008. It is one of the station's flagship news and current affairs programs.

Presenters
 Lee Charm
 Sid Kim
 Ahn Jung Hyun
 Michael Rhee

Segments
 International News
 Seoul City News
 In and Around Korea
 Evening Show Sports
 Reality Check
 Open Issues
 Page Turner
 Run Through History
 The Good Life

Past guests
 Richard M. Daley (Mayor of Chicago)
 Mitch Albom 
 Brian Reynolds Myers
 Irene Khan
 Mike Gravel
 Spencer Wells
 Nicholas G. Carr
 Asafa Powell
 Jeffrey Garten
 Sylvester Levay
 Juju Chang
 Victor Cha
 Marc Levy
 Junot Diaz
 Han Sung-joo (Korean minister of foreign affairs (1993–94) and South Korean ambassador to the United States (2003~2005)
 Kim Choong-soo (Governor of the Bank of Korea)
 Shin Hyun-song (Chief advisor on international economics to the President of Korea and Professor of Economics at Princeton  University)
 Soheila Vahdati (Iranian-American human rights activist based in California)
 Bud Welch (President of the Board of Directors from Murder Victims' Families for Human Rights)

References

External links

 http://tbs.seoul.kr/efm/EveningShow/gallery.jsp?search_boardId=20278
 http://news.naver.com/main/read.nhn?mode=LSD&mid=sec&sid1=102&oid=003&aid=0002428668
 http://www.munhwa.com/news/view.html?no=2008111401070243104002
 http://news.naver.com/main/read.nhn?mode=LSD&mid=sec&sid1=104&oid=044&aid=0000087343
 http://news.naver.com/main/read.nhn?mode=LSD&mid=sec&sid1=104&oid=044&aid=0000087277

South Korean television news shows
2008 South Korean television series debuts